Elsa Guerdrum Allen (1888, Washington, D.C. – 29 January 1969, Utica, New York) was an American ornithologist, lecturer, author and historian of ornithology, known for her 1951 book The history of American ornithology before Audubon.

Elsa Guerdrum received her B.S. from Cornell University in 1912 and married the ornithologist Arthur A. Allen in August 1913. They had five children, all of whom were born between 1918 and 1927. She earned a Ph.D. in zoology from Cornell in 1929. Most of her scholarly work dealt with the history of ornithology in North America before 1830.

According to Alan Feduccia, the first major archival study of Mark Catesby's life was Elsa Allen's 1937 article in The Auk. Her unpublished work includes a biographical study of John Abbot, a novel "The Story of Lalla", her diaries from 1912 to 1966, and "Minerva's Daughter". she died in New York at age 81

Selected publications

 (See Jacques le Moyne.)
 (See Nicolas Denys.)

References 

1888 births
1969 deaths
American ornithologists
Women ornithologists
Cornell University alumni
20th-century American zoologists